Neapolis was a common name of ancient cities, for others see Neapoli (disambiguation)

Neapolis meaning "New City", was an ancient city of Apulia, Italy, not mentioned by any ancient writer, but the existence of which is attested by its coins. There seems good reason to place it at Polignano a Mare, between Barium (modern Bari) and Egnatia (near modern Fasano), where numerous relics of antiquity have been discovered.

See also 
 List of ancient Greek cities

References

Apulia
Pre-Roman cities in Italy
Colonies of Magna Graecia